Wilberlee is a hamlet in the unparished area of Colne Valley, in the Kirklees district, in the county of West Yorkshire, England. It is near the town of Huddersfield and the village of Slaithwaite. Wilberlee has a school called Wilberlee Junior and Infant School.

See also
Listed buildings in Colne Valley (western area)

References 

 A-Z West Yorkshire (page 135)

Hamlets in West Yorkshire
Geography of Kirklees